Choqa Sarahi (also Romanized as Choqā Şarāḩī, Chaqa Sorahi, and Cheqā Şarāḩī; also known as Cheqā Sarā’īl, Choghā Sarā’īl, and Choghā Sera) is a village in Khezel-e Sharqi Rural District, Khezel District, Nahavand County, Hamadan Province, Iran. At the 2006 census, its population was 236, in 62 families.

References 

Populated places in Nahavand County